Dobele State Gymnasium (()) is a gymnasium (a pre-university high school) in Dobele, Latvia, founded in 1922. The official language of the school is Latvian, and students can also study English, Russian, and German.  Students in grades 10 - 12 concentrate on either Mathematics and Science, Humanities, or Business and Commerce.

History

The Dobele city council, supported by  Ministry of Education, decided to open a gymnasium (academically rigorous high school) in Dobele on January 7, 1921. Dobele city gymnasium was established one year later, on March 15, 1922. The first class began with 17 students—10 girls and 7 boys. The school became a cultural sanctuary known throughout the county.

On September 26, 2003, Dobele city gymnasium was granted a status change from the Dobele city gymnasium to the Dobele State gymnasium by the President of Latvia Vaira Vīķe-Freiberga.
In autumn of 2001, the Latvian Academy of Business and Management and an economics educational organization implemented a commerce program for Dobele students.

The school participates in the AFS inter-cultural exchange program and DVG students have studied abroad in many countries around the world, including Denmark, the US, and Scotland. DVG has also received exchange students from Australia, Germany, Austria, Thailand, Brazil, and France.

In 2006-2007, the school began a project to highlight teacher's educational process. The project was initiated by teacher L. Čebaņenko, who matriculated two 10th grade classes in a single year. Initially the project was supported by the EU, but after two years it was transferred to the Dobele city council. In the same year, the school was one of 50 schools in Latvia to receive approval for a science program with an emphasis on student research and lab work.

DVG students have earned awards in educational competitions at the district, county, national, and international level.

School traditions

DVG has passed down many traditions through the years. These include Knowledge Day, Sports Day, Adaptation Day, Teachers' Day, a Christmas concert, a St. Valentine's ball party, a Spring concert, Environment Day, and School Council sports tournaments including basketball, volleyball, and ice hockey.

Directors 

 Jacob Kamol (1922-1926)
 Ernest Francman (1926-1935)
 Jānis Jirgens (1935–1946)
 Jānis Miesnieks (1946–1950)
 Erna Veiskate (1950—1953)
 Sigurds Ziemelis (1953)
 Jean Sword (1953-1961)
 Bruno Jansons (1961—1965)
 Jānis Skrupskis (1965–1967)
 Olgerts Zanders (1967-1968)
 Valda Lasmane (1968-1974)
 Laimonis Kublinskis (1974-1985)
 Jānis Nemme (1985-1994)
 Guntis Safranovičs (1994-2003)
 Gundega Bicuse (2003-2008)
 Inese Didže (since 2008)

Alumni 
 Andrejs Šeļakovs
 Leonīds Kalniņš
 Klinta Reinholde
 Gatis Eglītis
 Vija Elarte
 Reniks Lauris

References

External links 
 Dobeles Valsts ģimnāzijas mājaslapa
 Dobeles Valsts ģimnāzijas Facebook
 Dobeles Valsts ģimnāzijas Twitters

Dobele Municipality
Secondary schools in Latvia
Educational institutions established in 1922
1922 establishments in Latvia